The Fat of the Land is the third studio album by English electronic music group the Prodigy, released on 30 June 1997 through XL Recordings. The album received critical acclaim and topped the UK Albums Chart and the US Billboard 200. It has sold over 10 million copies worldwide as of 2019.

Background, artwork and album title
While Liam Howlett is generally responsible for the compositions and Maxim Reality is featured on two tracks, this is the first record to include contributions by Keith Flint, who provides vocals on four of the songs and co-wrote three songs, including the two biggest hits, both of which reached number one on the UK Singles Chart. He is also the vocalist on a cover of the L7 song "Fuel My Fire" (from the 1994 album Hungry for Stink). The Fat of the Land album cover featured an image of a blackback crab and a new logo, dropping "The" and adding an ant silhouette. The album title comes from the old English phrase 'living off the fat of the land', which means living well or being wealthy.

Release 
Released in the first week of July, the album hit number one on the Billboard chart on 19 July 1997. Certified double platinum on 2 December that year, it sold 2,600,000 copies in the United States.

In 1999, The Fat of the Land entered the Guinness World Records as the fastest-selling UK album. The album was also nominated for Best Alternative Music Album at the 40th Annual Grammy Awards, but lost to Radiohead's OK Computer.

Controversy
The National Organization for Women objected to the seeming misogyny of "Smack My Bitch Up", though the band maintains that its true interpretation is "doing anything intensely". Liam Howlett observed, "That record was for the fans. Only brainless people get some stupid message out of it… I'm often misquoted. Some magazine said, 'Liam Howlett says his band are dangerous.' What I said was, 'For this band to survive, it has to be dangerous for us'… I wasn't saying we were dangerous because we're firestarters and we have spiky hair."

Legacy 

The album has been featured in a number of music publication lists:

 In 1998, Q magazine readers voted The Fat of the Land the ninth greatest album of all time. In 2000, Q placed it at number 47 in its list of the 100 greatest British albums ever. It has also been ranked number 43 in Q's "Best 50 Albums of Q's Lifetime" list, and was included in their "90 Best Albums of the 1990s" and "50 Best Albums of 1997" lists.
Rolling Stone included it in their "Essential Recordings of the 90s" list.
 Spin ranked it number 20 on their list of the "Top 20 Albums of the Year [1997]" list.
 Melody Maker ranked it number 13 on their list of "Albums of the Year" for 1997 and number 29 in their 1997 Pazz & Jop Critics' Poll.
 NME ranked it number 17 in their 1997 Critics' Poll.
 In 2000 it was voted number 269 in Colin Larkin's All Time Top 1000 Albums.
 Heavy metal-focused magazine Metal Hammer included it in their 2020 list of the top 10 1997 albums, citing it as "the point at which rave culture collided with metal culture".

The album is included in the book 1001 Albums You Must Hear Before You Die, and was nominated for the 1997 Mercury Music Prize.

Following Flint's death on 4 March 2019, fans used the hashtag 'Firestarter4Number1' on various social media platforms to replicate the song's success by getting it to the number one spot again; which was done out of respect for Keith Flint and to raise awareness of suicide among men. Shortly afterwards, "Firestarter" returned to the Billboard charts, entering number 13 on its Dance/Electronic Digital Song Sales chart in its 26 March 2019 issue, marking the first time that this song has appeared on a dance chart of any kind.

Track listing

Personnel 

The Prodigy
 Keith Flint – vocals ("Breathe", "Serial Thrilla", "Firestarter", "Fuel My Fire")
 Liam Howlett – keyboards, synthesizers, sampling, programming
 Maxim Reality – vocals ("Breathe", "Mindfields")
 Leeroy Thornhill – dancing (no musical contributions, appears in liner note photos and music videos only)

Additional musicians
 Shahin Badar – vocals ("Smack My Bitch Up")
 Kool Keith – vocals ("Diesel Power")
 Crispian Mills – vocals ("Narayan")
 Saffron – vocals ("Fuel My Fire")
 Gizz Butt – guitars ("Fuel My Fire")
 Jim Davies – guitars ("Breathe", "Firestarter")
 Matt Cameron – drums ("Narayan")
 Tom Morello – guitars ("No Man Army")

Other personnel
 Liam Howlett – production, engineering, mixing, art direction
 Neil McLellan – engineering
 Christian Ammann – photography
 JAKe – illustrations
 Alex Jenkins – art direction, design, photography
 Pat Pope – photography
 Alex Scaglia – photography
 Lou Smith – photography
 Terry Whittaker – photography
 Konrad Wothe – photography
 Mike Champion – management

Cover versions 

 In 2004, Kiss co-founder Gene Simmons covered "Firestarter" on his second solo album, Asshole. "Firestarter" was also covered by Sepultura on their album Kairos, and by Jimmy Eat World on their EP Firestarter.
 In 2007, Kula Shaker, led by Crispian Mills, incorporated elements from "Climbatize" and "Narayan" (the lyrics of which were written by Mills) in the song "Song of Love / Narayana" from the album Strangefolk.

Charts

Weekly charts

Year-end charts

Singles

Certifications

References

External links 
 

1997 albums
Maverick Records albums
The Prodigy albums
XL Recordings albums
Warner Records albums
Albums produced by Liam Howlett